Bane NOR Eiendom is a subsidiary of Bane NOR responsible for managing the commercial sections of the company's real estate. With headquarters in Oslo, the company manages  of space. The vast majority of this is in or in connection with railway stations. The company owns all of the railway stations in Norway.

Rom Eiendom was established in 2001 as Rom Eiendomsutvikling, with the responsibility to manage all NSB real estate not related to operations. In 2001, the management was outsourced to Aberdeen Property Investors. The present name change came as a result of the management being insourced back to the corporation in 2006.  In 2007, NSB Eiendom, which owned operational real estate, was merged into Rom. Within the portfolio of Rom are large sections of the real estate at Bjørvika in Oslo and Brattøra in Trondheim, both part of the ports in the cities, which are being transformed through urban redevelopment projects. Rom owns about 70 lots with a potential for 2 million square meters (20 million ft2) of building space.

On May 2, 2017, the ownership of Rom Eiendom was transferred to Bane NOR as part of a national rail reform plan, and the company was rebranded as Bane NOR Eiendom. As a result, properties formerly belonging to the Norwegian National Rail Administration and Bane NOR were transferred to Bane NOR Eiendom.

References

External links 

 Official website

Real estate companies of Norway
Norwegian State Railways
Real estate companies established in 2001
Companies based in Oslo
2001 establishments in Norway